Henry W. Petrie (March 4, 1857 - May 25, 1925) was an American composer and performer of popular music. Petrie was born in Bloomington, Illinois and died in Paw Paw, Michigan.

Songs 
 "Davy Jones' Locker"
 "I Don't Want To Play In Your Yard" w. Philip Wingate (1894)
 "Jonah and the Whale" w. Wingate Black (1894). 
 "The Owls Serenade" w. Arthur J. Lamb (1894)
 "Asleep in the Deep" w. Arthur J. Lamb (1897)
 "Where The Sunset Turns The Ocean's Blue To Gold" w. Eva Fern Buckner (1902)
 "In a Peach-basket Hat Made for Two" w. James M. Reilly (1909).
 "When The Twilight Comes To Kiss The Rose "Good-Night"" w. Robert F. Roden (1912)
 While The Stars In The Heavens Shine On" w. Harry D. Kerr (1914)

References

External links
 "Davy Jones' Locker" sheet music
 "When The Sunset Turns The Ocean's Blue To Gold" sheet music

1857 births
1925 deaths
Writers from Bloomington, Illinois